is the third single by Berryz Kobo, released on May 26, 2004, under the Piccolo Town label (PKCP-5040). It was also released as a Single V, on June 9, 2004. Risako Sugaya and Momoko Tsugunaga are the "centre" members on this single. Its peak position on the Oricon chart was #36.

Track listings

CD
  (Music and lyrics: Tsunku. Arrangement: Shōichirō Hirata)
  (Music and lyrics: Tsunku. Arrangement: Nao Tanaka)
 "Piriri to Yukō!" (Instrumental)

Single V
 "Piriri to Yukō!"
 "Piriri to Yukō!" (Close Up ver.)

External links
Piriri to Yukō! at the Up-Front Works discography listing (Japanese)
Piriri to Yukō! at the Hello! Project discography 

2004 singles
Songs written by Tsunku
Berryz Kobo songs
Song recordings produced by Tsunku
Piccolo Town singles
2004 songs